"Re-Ron" is a 1984 song by Gil Scott-Heron.  It criticizes the campaign for the re-election of Ronald Reagan.  It was recorded in collaboration with Bill Laswell.

Notable lines include:

"Would we take Fritz without Grits? We'd take Fritz the Cat. Would we take Jesse Jackson? Hell, we'd take Michael Jackson!"

The B-side of the record was "B-movie" which criticized the election of a former B-movie actor as the new president of the United States of America. These two songs by Scott-Heron were among many songs criticizing Reagan recorded by artists during the 1980s.

See also
Ronald Reagan in music

References

1983 singles
Satirical songs
Political songs
Protest songs
Songs about Ronald Reagan
Gil Scott-Heron songs
Arista Records singles